Mamontov is a Russian surname, derived from the word mamont, "mammoth". The feminine form is Mamontova.

It may refer to: 
Savva Mamontov
Konstantin Mamontov, anti-Bolshevik Cossack  general in Russian Civil War

See also
Asteroid 7381 Mamontov

Russian-language surnames